Joan Fitzgerald, Countess of Ormond, Countess of Desmond (Irish: Siobhán Nic Gearailt) (died 1565), was an Irish noblewoman and heiress, a member of the Old English FitzGerald family, who were also known as the "Geraldines".

She married three times. Her first husband was James Butler, 9th Earl of Ormond, who had been proposed as a bridegroom for Anne Boleyn in 1522 to settle a dispute over the Ormond title and estates. Her second was Francis Bryan, a courtier and lord justice of Ireland. Her third was Gerald FitzGerald, 14th Earl of Desmond. With her last marriage she brought a period of peace between the FitzGeralds of Desmond and the Butlers, who were hereditary enemies. After her death her widower resumed the old feud by attacking her son Thomas Butler, 10th Earl of Ormond.

During her third marriage she carried on an amicable correspondence with Queen Elizabeth I of England, who recognised Lady Desmond's skill in diplomacy, and relied upon her to restore and keep the precarious peace in southern Ireland.

Birth and origins 
Joan was probably born in 1514 in Munster, Ireland. She was the only daughter and heiress of James fitz Maurice FitzGerald by his wife Amy O'Brien. Her father was Earl of Desmond. He is here numbered the 10th, following the second edition of the Complete Peerage, but he is also numbered the 11th. Her father's family were the FitzGeralds of Desmond, a noble cadet branch of the Old English Geraldines, of which the FitzGeralds of Kildare were the senior branch.

Her mother was a daughter of Turlough O'Brien, a pre-reformation bishop of Killaloe (died 1525 or 1526), who had not stayed celibate. Her mother's family were the O'Briens of Ara (County Tipperary), a cadet branch of the O'Briens, kings of Thomond. 

By her father, Joan had two younger illegitimate half-sisters who are listed in her father's article.

Father's feuds with neighbours 
In the 1520s her father fought his neighbours, the lords of Muskerry in County Cork and the earls of Ormond in eastern Munster. He also quarrelled with his uncle Thomas fitz Thomas FitzGerald, called "the Bald", who sided with his enemies. In September 1520 or 1521 her father was defeated at the Battle of Mourne Abbey, south of Mallow, County Cork, by the allied forces of Cormac Laidir Oge MacCarthy, 10th Lord of Muskerry, and Thomas the Bald.

In December, Muskerry, Thomas the Bald, and Piers Butler, 8th Earl of Ormond, besieged her father unsuccessfully in Dungarvan.

Inheritance 
Joan FitzGerald's father, the 10th Earl, died on 18 June 1529. According to the Dictionary of Irish Biography he died at Rathkeale, County Limerick, most likely in the Castle Matrix. However, according to older sources he died at Dingle and was buried at Tralee. As the only legitimate child, Joan FitzGerald was heir general, but her granduncle Thomas the Bald, her father's enemy, was heir male and succeeded as 11th Earl of Desmond at the age of 75.

First marriage and children 
Joan FitzGerald's first husband was James Butler. He was the eldest son of Piers Butler, who had been in a dispute with Thomas Boleyn, over the estate and title of Ormond after the 7th Earl had died without a son in 1515. Piers Butler had in 1522 proposed his son as bridegroom for Anne Boleyn to settle the dispute. For reasons unknown, the marriage negotiations came to a halt, and Anne later married King Henry VIII of England as his second wife. In 1528 Henry VIII forced Piers Butler to renounce the title of Earl of Ormond and to become Earl of Ossory instead. Joan FitzGerald's new husband was therefore already in the middle of his thirties when he eventually married her in 1530. Her dowry consisted of land in County Tipperary along the boundary between the Desmond and the Ormond possessions, including the manors of Clonmel, Kilfeakle, and Kilsheelan. 

 
James and Joan had seven sons:
 Thomas ( – 1614), Black Tom, succeeded as the 10th Earl of Ormond, married firstly Elizabeth Berkeley; secondly, Elizabeth Sheffield, by whom he had an only daughter Elizabeth Preston, Countess of Desmond; thirdly, Helen Barry
 Edmund of Cloughgrenan (1534–1602), married Eleanor Eustace, by whom he had issue
 John of Kilcash (died 1570), married Katherine, daughter of Cormac na Haoine MacCarthy Reagh, 10th Prince of Carbery, by whom he had a son, Walter, 11th Earl of Ormond
 Walter of Ballynodagh, became the ancestor of the Butlers of Nodstown
 James of Duiske
 Edward of Cloughinche, married Mary, second daughter of the Richard Burke, 4th Earl of Clanricarde, by whom he had issue
 Piers of Grantstown

After the dramatic fall of the Boleyns, the earldom of Ormond reverted to her father-in-law in February 1538. On 26 August 1539 her husband succeeded as 9th Earl of Ormond and 2nd Earl of Ossory making her a double countess.

On 17 October 1546 Ormond went to dine at Ely House in Holborn, London. He fell victim of a mass poisoning along with his steward and 16 of his servants, possibly at the instigation of Anthony St Leger, who was Lord Deputy of Ireland and a political opponent. Ormond died on 28 October, leaving Lady Ormond a young dowager countess in her thirties. Thomas, the heir, was only 15 and therefore became a ward of the king. She travelled to London to make sure the wardship would be handled gently. As a widow, she could legally act independently and she regained control of her dowry. She administrated her dowry and jointure and played a major role in the affairs of house Ormond.

Second marriage 
In August 1548, she was persuaded to marry the English courtier and diplomat Francis Bryan. It is believed the marriage was a political maneuver to prevent Joan marrying her cousin, Gerald FitzGerald, heir to the Earldom of Desmond. Like her, Bryan had already been married once. His first wife had died childless in 1542. The union was not a happy one.

Nonetheless, Lady Ormond claimed the customary right to keep a private army of gallowglasses in Kilkenny, which greatly annoyed Edward Bellingham, who had replaced St Leger as lord deputy of Ireland on 22 April 1548.

The couple returned to Ireland in November 1549 and Bryan was appointed Lord Justice of Ireland on 27 December 1549 replacing Bellingham.

Due to his reputation as a rake and libertine at the English court, Sir Francis Bryan earned the nickname "Vicar of Hell". Joan is quoted as saying, While I was a widow and not married [to] an Englishman, I defended and kept my own, or at the least, no man went about to defeat me of my right. Well is the woman unmarried; I am bade to hold my peace, and my husband shall have answer made unto him."

Bryan died suddenly on 2 February 1550, at Clonmel while travelling. Apparently he died at table after heavy drinking. Poisoning was suspected by some and a postmortem examination was held. While Bryan lay dying at Clonmel, Joan was allegedly out on a hunting expedition with her second cousin, Gerald FitzGerald. Lady Joan was prevailed upon to wait a year before marrying Gerald.

Third marriage 
The precise date of her third marriage does not seem to be known. She did not wait long. Her third husband was her second cousin Gerald FitzGerald. The common ancestor was Thomas FitzGerald, 7th Earl of Desmond, great-grandfather to both. Gerald was the heir apparent of James FitzGerald, the reigning Earl of Desmond, numbered the 13th. She was about 41 while he was about 17. In 1551 her son Thomas was given livery of the Ormond estate.

The marriage brought about a temporary peace in Ireland between the rival families of Butler and FitzGerald. On 14 October 1558 Gerald succeeded to the earldom becoming the 14th, 15th, or 16th Earl of Desmond depending on the numbering. This made Joan Countess of Desmond. She used her considerable talent for diplomacy to act as a "peacemaker" between her eldest son and her third husband.

Desmond–Ormond feud 
Joan maintained a friendly correspondence with Queen Elizabeth, who recognised her ability, and relied on her to restore and keep the precarious peace in Munster after her husband, allegedly tired of Joan's domination over him, broke the truce with her eldest son, Thomas, who had succeeded his father as Earl of Ormond. After the two factions began making raids against one another, Joan spent nearly two weeks journeying back and forth on horseback to arbitrate between the two enemy camps, before a tenuous peace was finally re-established in 1560. In 1562, her husband was sent to the Tower of London for his allegedly "insolent" behaviour before the Privy Council. Joan worked hard to persuade the queen to release him. She was eventually successful and her husband returned to Ireland in November 1563.

In 1560 her intervention secured a peaceful outcome to a stand-off near Tipperary, known as "the battle that never was".

Death and timeline 
Lady Desmond died on 2 January 1565 at Askeaton, County Limerick. She was buried at the Franciscan Friary of Askeaton. After her death the relationship between Dermond and Ormond deteriorated rapidly. On 8 February 1565 they fought the Battle of Affane where her Butler son took her widower captive. The ensuing Desmond rebellions earned her widower the sobriquet of "rebel earl" and ended with his forfeiture and killing in 1583.

Notes and references

Notes

Citations

Sources 

  – 1534 to 1558
 
 
 
 
 
 
 
  – D to F
  – N to R
  – Dacre to Dysart (for Desmond)
 
  – (Preview)
  – (PDF downloadable from given URL)
  – (Preview)
 
  – (for timeline)
  – Document Preview
  – Online abstract
 
 
 
  – "The bald", earl of Desmond
 
 
 
 
 
 
 
 

1565 deaths
16th-century births
16th-century Irish people
16th-century Irish women
Joan
Daughters of Irish earls
Joan
Irish countesses
People from County Cork
FitzGerald
Women of the Tudor period
Year of birth uncertain